Heliothis melanoleuca is a species of moth of the family Noctuidae. It is endemic to Hawaii, where it is found in riparian forest.

Heliothis
Endemic moths of Hawaii
Moths described in 1997